Marie Paris Pişmiş de Recillas (30 January 1911 – 1 August 1999) was an Armenian-Mexican astronomer.

Pişmiş was born Mari Sukiasian in 1911, in Ortaköy, Istanbul. She completed her high school studies at Üsküdar American Academy. In 1937, she became the first woman to get a Ph.D. from the Science Faculty of Istanbul University. Her advisor was Erwin Finlay Freundlich. Later, she went to Harvard University where she met her future husband Félix Recillas, a Mexican mathematician. They settled in Mexico, and she became the first professional astronomer in Mexico. According to Dorrit Hoffleit, "she is the one person most influential in establishing Mexico’s importance in astronomical education and research".

For more than 50 years she worked at UNAM which awarded her a number of prizes including the "Science Teaching Prize". She was a member of the Mexican Academy of Sciences.

Pişmiş studied among others the kinematics of galaxies, H II nebulae, the structure of open star clusters and planetary nebulae. She compiled the catalogue Pismis of 24 open clusters and 2 globular clusters in the southern hemisphere.

In 1998, she published an autobiography entitled "Reminiscences in the Life of Paris Pişmiş: a Woman Astronomer". 
She died in 1999. According to her wish, she was cremated. Her daughter Elsa Recillas Pishmish, son-in-law Carlos Cruz-González, and grand-daughter Irene Cruz-González also became astronomers.

References

Further reading

External links
 Biography 
 Bülent Uyar on Paris Pişmiş 
 İspanyol.com 

1911 births
1999 deaths
20th-century astronomers
Mexican people of Armenian descent
Scientists from Istanbul
Mexican astronomers
Turkish people of Armenian descent
Turkish astronomers
Turkish emigrants to Mexico
Turkish women academics
Turkish academics
Women astronomers
Armenian astronomers
Academic staff of the National Autonomous University of Mexico
Members of the Mexican Academy of Sciences